Deborah Font Jiménez (born 6 September 1985 in El Vendrell, Tarragona) is a swimmer from Spain.

Personal 
Font was born 6 September 1985 in El Vendrell, Tarragona. She has a disability: she is blind. She found a job with assistance from the Employment HPOD PROAD Program, which is supported by ONCE. In December 2013, she attended an event marking Spanish insurance company Santa Lucía Seguros becoming a sponsor of the Spanish Paralympic Committee, and consequently Plan ADOP which funds high performance Spanish disability sport competitors.  She chose to attend the event because she wanted to show support for this type of sponsorship.

Swimming 
Font is an B2/S12 classification swimmer. When swimming, she has a "tapper" who taps her so she knows when she has to initiate a turn in the water.

Font competed at the 2000 Summer Paralympics, where she earned a gold medal in the 100 meter breaststroke race, and a pair of bronze medals in the 400 meter freestyle race and the 200 meter individual medley race. She raced at the 2004 Summer Paralympics, and earned a silver in the 100 meter breaststroke race. In 2007, she competed at the IDM German Open.  She competed at the 2008 Summer Paralympics, and won a bronze in the 50 meter freestyle race.  Total, she has a gold medal, two silvers and four bronze medals from the Paralympic Games.

In 2011, Font trained with Carla Casals. She competed at the 2011 IPC European Swimming Championships in Berlin, Germany where she won a bronze medal in the 100 meter breaststroke. In 2012, she competed at the Paralympic Swimming Championship of Spain by Autonomous Communities. She raced at the 2012 Summer Paralympics. She was the number three swimmer in the 400 meter freestyle race.  She finished sixth in the 200 meter individual medley. She competed at the 2013 IPC Swimming World Championships. From the Catalan region of Spain, she was a recipient of a 2012 Plan ADO scholarship. In November 2013, she competed at the Spanish Age Swimming Championships for blind and visually impaired.

References

External links 
 
 

1985 births
Living people
Paralympic swimmers of Spain
Paralympic bronze medalists for Spain
Paralympic silver medalists for Spain
Paralympic gold medalists for Spain
Paralympic medalists in swimming
Paralympic swimmers with a vision impairment
Swimmers at the 2000 Summer Paralympics
Swimmers at the 2004 Summer Paralympics
Swimmers at the 2008 Summer Paralympics
Swimmers at the 2012 Summer Paralympics
Medalists at the 2000 Summer Paralympics
Medalists at the 2004 Summer Paralympics
Medalists at the 2008 Summer Paralympics
Medalists at the 2012 Summer Paralympics
Medalists at the World Para Swimming European Championships
Plan ADOP alumni
S12-classified Paralympic swimmers
People from Baix Penedès
Sportspeople from the Province of Tarragona
Swimmers from Catalonia
Spanish female freestyle swimmers
Spanish female breaststroke swimmers
Spanish female medley swimmers
21st-century Spanish women
Spanish blind people